Kaabil is a 2017 Indian Hindi-language romantic action thriller film directed by Sanjay Gupta, written by Vijay Kumar Mishra, produced by Rakesh Roshan under his banner FilmKraft Productions. It stars Hrithik Roshan, Yami Gautam, Ronit Roy and Rohit Roy. The music was composed by Rajesh Roshan. Principal photography of the film began on 30 March 2016.

The film follows a blind voiceover artist who becomes disillusioned when his wife faces injustice and dies. He becomes a vigilante and decides to seek revenge against those responsible for his wife's death, while also dodging police with a cover that no one would believe a blind man can kill someone. Kaabil was released theatrically on 25 January 2017. Roshan received the Nomination of Filmfare Award for Best Actor for his performance at the 63rd Filmfare Awards. The film was commercially successful despite performing weakly upon its release in China in 2019.

Plot 
Rohan Bhatnagar is a kind young man who has been blind since birth and works as a voice-over artist in animated programmes for a living. Through his friends, he meets Supriya, a working woman who is also blind, but proudly independent. The two fall in love and get married. One night, on their way back home after dining out, they are interrupted by Amit Shellar, a local goon and younger brother of Madhavrao Shellar, a well-known politician. He and his friend Wasim, drunkenly misbehave with the couple, enraging Rohan. The next morning while Rohan is at work, Amit and Wasim sneak into the house and assault Supriya. A horrified Rohan immediately calls the police; Officer Chaubey advises him to get his wife medically examined in 24 hours to prove the assault. While Rohan and Supriya are on their way to the clinic, they are kidnapped by Shellar's men and held captive for 36 hours. After being set free, Rohan and Supriya are criticized by police for the delay in getting Supriya clinically examined, and are accused of being liars. Heartbroken, they return home. Supriya attempts to live normally but Rohan becomes silent and introspective, which hurts her. One morning, Rohan returns early from work to apologize to Supriya for not being as supportive as he should have, only to find her corpse, hanging from the ceiling fan. Madhavrao visits Rohan and reveals that his brother Amit assaulted Supriya not once but twice. 

Rohan finds Supriya's suicide note, which ascertains that Amit had assaulted her a second time; this second assault led to her suicide. Shattered, Rohan implies to Officer Chaubey that he will avenge his wife's death, challenging that Chaubey will know who did it but will be able to do nothing about it, just like he did nothing about Supriya's case. Rohan uses his voice modulating skills to lure the culprits to places that Rohan knows well. First, he tricks Wasim and hangs him, leaving Amit's handkerchief behind to frame Amit. He then lures Amit to the warehouse where he and Supriya were held captive for 36 hours. He finds Amit by scent, tying him down to be burned alive in an explosion. Chaubey suspects Rohan for Amit and Wasim's murders and puts him under house arrest. Rohan gets past the police with the help of his friend, and calls Madhavrao to a building under construction that was to be Rohan and Supriya's new home. There, Rohan kills him and makes it look like a suicide. Rohan later relates the story to Chaubey: he made it look as if Amit killed Wasim, then Madhavrao committed suicide due to the pain of Amit's death. With no evidence against Rohan, a blind man, Chaubey stands helpless. His vengeance completed, Rohan scatters Supriya's ashes at sea.

Cast 
 Hrithik Roshan as Rohan Bhatnagar
 Yami Gautam as Su/Supriya Sharma/Supriya Bhatnagar
 Ronit Roy as Madhavrao Shellar
 Rohit Roy as Amit Shellar
 Narendra Jha as Inspector Amol Chaube
 Suresh Menon as Zafar (Rohan's Friend)
 Sahidur Rahman as Wasim
 Akhilendra Mishra as Wasim's father
 Girish Kulkarni as Sub-Inspector Pravin Nalavde
 Urvashi Rautela (special appearance in song "Haseeno Ka Deewana")
 Shaji Chaudhary as Anna

Production

Development 
Sanjay Gupta announced the film officially in January 2016 with Hrithik Roshan portraying the lead role, Rakesh Roshan producing the project and Rajesh Roshan composing the film score. Yami Gautam was confirmed to play the lead heroine while brothers Ronit Roy and Rohit Roy have played negative role in the film.

The film is produced by Rakesh Roshan under his production house under FilmKraft Productions Pvt. Ltd. Rajesh Roshan will compose the music and Salim–Sulaiman giving background music to the film and Resul Pookutty for the film's sound design. The film's cinematography was performed by Sudeep Chatterjee and Ayananka Bose.

Filming 
The principal photography commenced in Mumbai in March 2016. The entire shooting is scheduled to be completed by July 2016. The movie is slated to release on 25 January 2017. Filming for the first schedule wrapped on 19 June 2016. Film shooting was completed in 77 days.

Release 
The film was released on 25 January 2017 worldwide along with Rahul Dholakia's Raees starring Shah Rukh Khan. Kaabil opened in 2700 screens whereas Raees opened in 3500 screens. On 2 February 2017, Kaabil was released across Pakistan, becoming the first Indian film to be screened in Pakistan, post lifting of ban on Indian films after the 2016 Uri terror attack and its aftermath. It was released in Hindi along with its Tamil dubbed version titled Balam.

Following the good performance of the film at the box-office, Kaabil was released on around 200 more screens in India, on 2 February 2017. Kaabil was released in China on 5 June 2019.

Critical reception 
Taran Adarsh of Bollywood Hungama gave the movie 4 out of 5 stars and wrote, "On the whole, Kaabil is gripping, gut-wrenching and is likely to stay with you for a long time."

The Indian Express gave the movie 1.5 out of 5 and said, "Hrithik does all the heavy lifting and remains the only bright spot in this dispirited mess of a movie. He still has the moves. What he needs is a plot."

Meena Iyer of Times of India gave the film a rating of 4/5 stars, noting that the movie seemed to be inspired by the 1989 movie Blind Fury and the 2014 Korean movie Broken. Iyer praised Roshan's performance as his "all-time best", and felt that the character Rohan was "vulnerable as a lover and menacing as a killing-machine".

Sarita A. Tanwar of Daily News and Analysis gave the rating of 4/5 stars stating "Kaabil is old-school, emotional and forceful. And an absolute must for all Hrithik Roshan fans. And if you aren't his fan, you might feel differently after this film".

Writing for The Hindu, Namrata Joshi gave the film 2 out of 5 and called it a "predictable revenge and retribution saga that offers nothing new other than the visually impaired protagonists."

Rachit Gupta from Filmfare wrote "Hrithik carries this film on his capable shoulders. His perfectly nuanced performance is the reason you’ll enjoy the thrills of Kaabil." and gave the movie 3 stars out of 5.

Bollywood Bubble gave the movie a rating of 4 out of 5 and said, "‘Kaabil’ will present you a far bitter truth. It'll draw a very uncomfortable, shrewd reality wherein the ones in greater need of support are the ones often thrown on the edge, laughed at. It'll show you a world in desperate need of more compassion, more kindness."

Joginder Tuteja of Movie Talkies gave the rating of 4/5 stars and said, "Rakesh Roshan has ensured that Kaabil turns out to be a commercial film for the audiences that has all the right ingredients in place and that too in the right proportions. It must have been quite a challenge to have three creative brains (Sanjay, Hrithik and himself) to blend seamlessly and deliver a product which is in just the right synch. That happens with Kaabil and that is the right reason why the final outcome keeps you glued on the screen right till the end."

Business Standard criticized the movie's plot and direction: "I’m not sure what’s more infuriating about this film – whether it’s regressive or stupid. Or whether it’s regressive and stupid and joyless and monotonous and silly and pointless. In fact, let’s call Kaabil for what it is: a B-movie with well-known actors. Worse, it’s exacerbated by shoddy CG, fake earnestness and a needless item number."

Udita Jhunjhunwala from First Post gave the rating of 3/5 and wrote, "If you are able to look past many of these niggles it's thank to Hrithik Roshan's committed performance which keeps you rooting for his Rohan all the way."

Sukanya Varma from Rediff.com gave the film 2.5 on 5, and felt that "Kaabil serves nothing beyond an unabashed platform to vaunt a seething Hrithik, sentimental Hrithik, snarky Hrithik, sly Hrithik or spry Hrithik...". Saibal Chaterjee from NDTV gave the movie 2.5 out of 5, calling the film "...paisa vasool ( worth the money) fare, if not more."

Mike McCahill from The Guardian gave the film 2 out of 5, and remarked that "Sanjay Gupta's tale of a blind dubbing artist avenging the ghost of his wife is the sort of nonsense the Indian film industry stopped churning out 20 years ago."

Soundtrack 

Complete soundtrack album was released on 21 December 2016 by T-Series.

The soundtrack for Kaabil is composed by Rajesh Roshan. The song "Haseeno Ka Deewana" is a cover version of "Sara Zamana" from Roshan's original soundtrack to the film Yaarana (1981). The original Yaarana version was sung by Kishore Kumar, and featured Amitabh Bachchan and Neetu Singh in the music video. The Kaabil cover version is sung by Payal Dev with rapper Raftaar, while the music video is an item number featuring Urvashi Rautela.

References

External links 

 
 
 

2017 films
2010s Hindi-language films
2017 action drama films
2017 action thriller films
Indian action drama films
Indian action thriller films
Indian vigilante films
Films about rape in India
Indian films about revenge
Films about blind people in India
Films scored by Rajesh Roshan
Films scored by Salim–Sulaiman
Films shot in Mumbai
Indian rape and revenge films
Films directed by Sanjay Gupta
2010s vigilante films